In High Places (Italian:Quartieri alti) is a 1943 Italian comedy film directed by Mario Soldati and starring Adriana Benetti, Massimo Serato and Nerio Bernardi. It is based on a play by Jean Anouilh. The film portrays the rise into high society of an immoral young man. It belongs to the movies of the calligrafismo style.

Cast
 Adriana Benetti as  Isabella
 Massimo Serato as  Giorgio Zanetti 
 Nerio Bernardi as Emilio Buscaglione 
 Enzo Biliotti as Febo Marcantoni 
 Natalia Ray as Edmea 
 Jucci Kellerman as Barbara 
 Fanny Marchiò as Donna Lina Rigotti 
 Maria Melato as Maria Letizia Bruneschi 
 Gina Sammarco as La falsa madre di Giorgio 
 Giulio Stival as Il falso padre di Giorgio 
 Piero Pastore as Bottarini, il calciatore 
 Giuseppe Pierozzi as Il tabaccaio gobbo 
 Vittorio Sanipoli as Roberto 
 Alfredo Del Pelo as Il chitarrista all1 taverna "Ulpia" 
 Gilda Marchiò as L'affituaria della villa 
 Marco Monari Rocca as Il conte Giandomenico

References

Bibliography 
 Brunetta, Gian Piero. The History of Italian Cinema: A Guide to Italian Film from Its Origins to the Twenty-first Century. Princeton University Press, 2009.
 Landy, Marcia. The Folklore of Consensus: Theatricality in the Italian Cinema, 1930-1943. SUNY Press, 1998.

External links 
 

1943 films
Italian comedy films
1943 comedy films
1940s Italian-language films
Films directed by Mario Soldati
Italian films based on plays
Films based on works by Jean Anouilh
Italian black-and-white films
1940s Italian films